Iolaus vansomereni is a butterfly in the family Lycaenidae. It is found in north-western Uganda. The habitat consists of savanna.

References

Butterflies described in 1958
Iolaus (butterfly)
Endemic fauna of Uganda
Butterflies of Africa